Cheikhou Kouyaté (born 21 December 1989) is a Senegalese professional footballer who plays as a central midfielder or centre-back for Premier League club Nottingham Forest and the Senegal national team.

Kouyaté moved from Senegal to Belgium in 2006, having been offered a youth contract at RWDM Brussels. He played ten games before moving to Anderlecht aged 19, where he made 206 appearances and won the Belgian First Division A four times. In June 2014, he joined West Ham United of the Premier League, and four years later he transferred to Crystal Palace for an estimated £9.5 million.

Kouyaté represented the Senegal national team at the 2012 Olympics. He played at two FIFA World Cup and four Africa Cup of Nations tournaments, including Senegal's victory in 2021.

Club career

Early career
Kouyaté began his footballing career in 1996 in his hometown with ASC Yego Dakar and was scouted by RWDM Brussels in September 2006. RWDM Brussels then signed the player in January the following year. He went on to play ten league appearances for the first team between 2007 and 2008.

Anderlecht
As Kouyaté turned 19, he left Brussels because his former employers did not pay him three months' worth of wages. He subsequently moved to Anderlecht in the same city on a four-year deal for a free transfer. He also had a loan at KV Kortrijk. Kouyaté made 153 league appearances for Anderlecht, scoring four goals in five seasons at the club. He won the 2009–10, 2011–12, 2012–13 and 2013–14 league titles as well as the 2010–11, 2012–13 and 2013–14 Belgian Super Cups.

West Ham United

2014–15 season

On 18 June 2014, Kouyaté signed for West Ham United on a four-year contract for a fee of £7 million. He made his West Ham debut on 16 August in a 1–0 home defeat to Tottenham Hotspur, for which his performance was described as "impressive" by the BBC. The following week, manager Sam Allardyce compared him to ex-Arsenal captain Patrick Vieira. On 28 December, Kouyaté scored his first West Ham goal in a 2–1 defeat to Arsenal. His second goal of the season came on 8 February 2015 in a 1–1 draw with Manchester United. His performance in the game won praise from manager Allardyce for Kouyaté's Man of the Match performance which was also singled out as the Individual Performance of the Season, by a West Ham player, at the clubs' annual awards. He scored two further goals in the season, in a 2–2 away draw with Tottenham and in a 2–1 away defeat to Leicester City. Kouyaté finished the season having played 31 out of a possible 38 Premier League games.

2015–16 season
On 9 August 2015, Kouyaté scored the opening goal in the 43rd minute in a 2–0 win over Arsenal at the Emirates Stadium. He then scored in a 4–3 home defeat to AFC Bournemouth on 22 August. He scored his third goal of the season in a 2–2 draw with Norwich City on 26 September, netting the equalizer in the 90th minute to rescue a point for West Ham. In March 2016, Kouyate signed a new, five-year contract with West Ham that could keep him at the club until 2021. Kouyaté was sent-off twice during the 2015–16 season and on both occasions had the card rescinded by The Football Association (FA). On 21 February, he was dismissed by referee Jonathan Moss in a 5–1 FA Cup win at Blackburn Rovers, only for the card to be rescinded a few days later. On 2 April, he was dismissed in a Premier League game at the Boleyn Ground against Crystal Palace by referee Mark Clattenburg. This too, however, was overturned a few days later.

2016–17 season
On 4 August 2016, Kouyaté scored West Ham's first ever goal at the Olympic Stadium, coming in the eighth minute of a Europa League game against NK Domžale. He also scored the second in the game, which West Ham won 3–0. On 26 October 2016, Kouyaté scored the opening goal in a 2–1 EFL Cup victory against rivals Chelsea. On 8 April 2017, Kouyaté scored a "stunning low 25-yard strike", as West Ham beat relegation rivals Swansea City.

2017–18 season
On 23 September 2017, Kouyaté scored his first goal of the season in a 3–2 loss against Tottenham. Kouyaté's final goal for the club came on 24 November 2017, scoring the equaliser in a 1–1 draw with Leicester City. Kouyaté marked the headed goal with a lowered crossed-armed celebration, designed to help raise awareness about the ongoing slavery in Libya.

Crystal Palace 
On 1 August 2018, Kouyaté completed a move to fellow London club Crystal Palace on a four-year deal for an undisclosed fee, believed to be £9.5 million. He made his debut ten days later in a 2–0 win at Fulham, as an 88th-minute substitute for Andros Townsend. He scored his first goal in his 54th game on 26 December 2019, equalising in a 2–1 win over his previous club at Selhurst Park.

After the arrival of Patrick Vieira as manager in 2021, Kouyaté continued to play in midfield or an expanded defence in a 5–3–2 formation (as against part of a back-four in 2020–21) while his former midfield partners Luka Milivojević and James McArthur waned in importance. Kouyaté played in Palace's run to the semi-finals of the 2021–22 FA Cup, scoring in a 2–1 home win over Stoke City in the fifth round on 1 March. In May 2022, Kouyaté called his Senegalese teammate Idrissa Gueye a "real man" for reportedly refusing to wear a Paris Saint-Germain shirt with a rainbow-coloured number for LGBT rights. Vieira said that he would have a private discussion with Kouyaté.

Nottingham Forest
On 13 August 2022, Kouyaté signed a two-year deal with Premier League side Nottingham Forest.

International career
Kouyaté was called up aged 18 to the Senegal under-20s in the same year as his RWDM Brussels debut. He scored two goals in just three games for the side in 2007.

On 29 February 2012, Kouyaté made his debut for the Senegal senior team as a 56th-minute substitute for Mohamed Diamé in a goalless friendly draw away to South Africa. At the time, he had been in the process of naturalisation as a Belgian citizen, and had been linked to the European country's national team. In the same year, he was announced to be in the squad for Senegal Olympic football team. He played in every game as Senegal's debut appearance in the tournament ended in a knockout in the quarter-final. 

In January 2015, he was a member of the squad for the 2015 Africa Cup of Nations, held in Equatorial Guinea. He scored his first international goal on 5 September in 2017 Africa Cup of Nations qualification, in a 2–0 win away to Namibia.

He was part of the 23-man squad for the 2018 FIFA World Cup in Russia, and played all seven games as Senegal finished runners-up in the 2019 Africa Cup of Nations in Egypt. At the 2021 Africa Cup of Nations, he played six for the winners, having been suspended for the last 16 against Cape Verde. Returning for the quarter-finals against Equatorial Guinea, he restored their lead in a 3–1 win having been on for two minutes as a substitute.

Personal life
Kouyaté is married to Zahra Mbow. They have a son born in 2021. According to various Senegalese media outlets, Kouyaté has a second wife. Kouyaté is a practising Muslim and made the Hajj pilgrimage to Mecca.

Career statistics

Club

International

Scores and results list Senegal's goal tally first.

Honours
Anderlecht
Belgian Pro League: 2009–10, 2011–12, 2012–13, 2013–14
Belgian Super Cup: 2010, 2012, 2013

Senegal
 African Cup of Nations: 2021; runner-up: 2019

References

External links

Profile at the Nottingham Forest F.C. website

1989 births
Living people
Footballers from Dakar
Senegalese footballers
Senegal international footballers
Association football midfielders
R.W.D.M. Brussels F.C. players
R.S.C. Anderlecht players
K.V. Kortrijk players
West Ham United F.C. players
Crystal Palace F.C. players
Nottingham Forest F.C. players
Belgian Pro League players
Premier League players
2015 Africa Cup of Nations players
2017 Africa Cup of Nations players
2018 FIFA World Cup players
2019 Africa Cup of Nations players
2021 Africa Cup of Nations players
2022 FIFA World Cup players
Africa Cup of Nations-winning players
Olympic footballers of Senegal
Footballers at the 2012 Summer Olympics
Senegalese expatriate footballers
Expatriate footballers in Belgium
Expatriate footballers in England
Senegalese expatriate sportspeople in Belgium
Senegalese expatriate sportspeople in England
Senegalese Muslims